Bangladesh International School and College, formerly Bangladesh International School, is a private school located in New DOHS, Mohakhali, Dhaka, Bangladesh. It is managed by the Bangladesh Army Station Headquarters, Dhaka Cantonment, Dhaka. The school was established in 1995 to provide high quality educational services in English.

As of 2023, the chairman of the governing body is Brigadier General S M Zia-Ul-Azim, and the chief patron is Major General Md. Zahirul Islam.

History
To set up an English medium school in DOHS area was first envisaged and planned by Mr. S M Al Mamun, the then DML & C and colonel ATMN Chowdhury (retd), the then Station Commander, Dhaka and founder Chairman of BISC. Foundation Stone of the school building was laid by Mr. S M Al Mamun on 2nd April 1994. It was decided to start the school with five classes from Play Group to STD I. It was also proposed that it would be developed to have classes leading up to the A level standard eventually. The School was given the cherished start on the 14th March 1995 under the dynamic leadership of founder Principal in Charge Mr. A K M Sufiur Rahman with only 27 students. No formal opening ceremony was organized on that auspicious day as because the number of students was too small, only 27. BISC is situated on 1.60 acre of land in DOHS Mohakhali. Initially it was planned to establish a standard primary school here but subsequently original plan was changed and English medium school , BISC is established with a prime objective to serve the Bangladeshi and foreign communities living is cantonment area and its periphery. It is now following both National and International curricula under London University and accordingly preparing the students for Secondary School Certificate(S C) and O level examination. Presently 1946 students have been studying in this institution out of which 1289 (66 %) are wards of defense personnel and 657 (34%) are the words of non defense personnel. ‘A’ level and Higher Secondary Certificate Examination (H S C) have been started from the calendar year 2010 and 2011. This institution was initially managed by Cantonment Board, Dhaka Cantonment and subsequently by Station Headquarters, Dhaka Cantonment. Finally, it is now Army Headquarters who has been managing this institution since October 2005. In the meeting of the Cantonment board held on 4th December 1994 it was decided that Chief patron of BISC would be Chief of Army Staff, Bangladesh Army. In this connection it may be mentioned that the Chief of Army Staff was kind enough to accept the proposal and become Chief Patron with effect from 4th February 1998. The first meeting of the Governing Body was held on 29th April 1995 and in that meeting Mr. S M Al Mamun was made the Life Member of this institution for his outstanding contribution. This institution is absolutely a non profitable organization.

 

The first H.S.C national curriculum batch of students started in 2011 with 15 students. The batch was inaugurated on 17 September 2011 and the school was renamed Bangladesh International School and College.

Academic year and curriculum

International curriculum
Students in this curriculum are prepared for O level and A level exams.

National curriculum
The school started the national curriculum in 2006 (English version). In this curriculum the students are prepared for the Secondary School Certificate and Higher Secondary Certificate examinations. The students used to sit the PECE exam at Class 5 and JSC at Class 8, but now according to the new curriculum they don't have to. The students follow the textbooks, translated in English, of and published by National Board of Intermediate and Secondary Education in Bangladesh.

See also
 List of schools in Bangladesh

References
https://bisc.com.bd/history-of-bisc/

External links
 

International schools in Dhaka
Educational institutions established in 1995
Educational Institutions affiliated with Bangladesh Army
1995 establishments in Bangladesh